
The following lists events that happened during 1808 in South Africa.

Events
 The settlement of Clanwilliam is established
 The slave trade is abolished.
 The Perseverance Tavern opens in Cape Town, becoming South Africa's oldest pub by the time it closes in 2020.

Births
 31 January - Jacobus Nicolaas Boshoff, the 2nd president of the Orange Free State from 1855 to 1859, is born in Kogmanskloof, Montagu.

References
See Years in South Africa for list of References

History of South Africa